The Mongolian Lunar New Year, commonly known as Tsagaan Sar (Cagán sar /  ,  or literally White Moon), is the first day of the year according to the Mongolian lunisolar calendar. The festival of the Lunar New Year is celebrated by the Mongols and some Turkic peoples. The holiday has shamanistic influences.

Timing 
The White Moon festival is celebrated on the first through third days of the first lunar month. Tibet's Losar occurs on the same day as the Mongolian White Moon.
Tsagaan Sar is one of the most important Mongolian holidays. Originally, it was celebrated in spring.

History 
The Mongols of Genghis Khan used the twelve-year animal cycle to mark their chronology. The Secret History of the Mongols written in 1240 as well as many letters of the Khans extensively use the twelve-year animal cycle. On the Year of the Red Hare, Genghis Khan ascended and purified himself on the first day of the lunar new year, wore new clothes, paid respects to Heaven and Earth, bowed and greeted his mother Hoelun and took part in a ceremony in his palace. On the first day of the lunar new year of the Year of the Rat (1216), Genghis Khan distributed gold presents to people aged over 60.

Marco Polo describes a Mongolian Lunar New Year (White Moon) celebrated by Kublai Khan in the 13th century during the Yuan Dynasty (1271-1368). In Book Two, Part One he writes:

After the Red Turban Rebellion drove the Mongols out of China in 1368 the Northern Yuan Dynasty continued Mongol traditions in the Mongol homeland. In contrast to the Naadam festival in summer which celebrates manly virtues Tsagaan Sar celebrates the softer virtues of peace and harmony. The color white represented especially by the white foods or "tsagaan idee" (various dairy products and rice with raisins) symbolize purity of intent. In Paragraph 254 of the Secret History of the Mongols the sons of Genghis Khan fight over who will succeed as next Khan. Genghis Khan sits silently as they fight. Khukhuchos speaks up and reprimands Chagatai (whose name, also written Tsagaadai, incidentally means White): "Chagatai, you have spoken careless words that have frozen the warm liver of your good queen mother, grieved her loving heart, dried her oil-like thoughts and curdled her milk white spirit." During Tsagaan Sar emphasis is placed on purity of intent or whiteness of spirit when visiting elder relatives. The greeting "Amar baina uu" (Are you in peace?) is said while the arms are extended with open palms showing no bad intention. The younger places his or her arms below the elder in a supporting fashion, both bow and embrace and the traditional Mongolian "sniff-kiss" is given by the elder on both cheeks. This traditional gesture is called zolgokh (greeting). Quarreling is taboo and emphasis is placed on genuine reconciliation. Gift-giving is central to Tsagaan Sar. A lavish feast is usually laid out to wish for happiness and prosperity in the coming year.

During the Qing Dynasty, the Mongolians followed the "shar zurhai" (yellow horoscope) to determine the day of the Lunar New Year. From 1911 onwards during the Bogd Khanate of Mongolia, the Mongolians have used the Tugs Bayasgalant horoscope which differs from the yellow horoscope on certain years.

In 2011, the holiday was nominated for UNESCO's Intangible cultural heritage list

Ceremony 
The customs of Tsagaan Sar are significantly different depending on the region. In Mongolia around the New Year for example, families burn candles at the altar symbolizing Buddhist enlightenment. Also people greet each other with holiday-specific greetings such as Амар байна уу? (Amar baina uu?), meaning "Are you living peacefully?" Mongols also visit friends and family on this day and exchange gifts. A typical Mongol family will meet in the home dwelling of the eldest in the family. Many people will be dressed in full garment of national Mongol costumes. When greeting their elders during the White Moon festival, Mongols perform the zolgokh greeting, grasping them by their elbows to show support for them. The eldest receives greetings from each member of the family except for his/her spouse. During the greeting ceremony, family members hold long, typically blue, silk cloths called a khadag. After the ceremony, the extended family eats sheep's tail, mutton, rice with curds, dairy products, and buuz. It is also typical to drink airag and exchange gifts. Before the day, many Mongols had to clean their houses.

The day before Tsagaan Sar is called Bituun, the name of the lunar phase of a new or dark moon. The lunar phases are Bituun (dark moon), Shined (new crescent moon), Tergel (full moon), and Huuchid (waxing moon). On the Bituun day, people thoroughly clean around home, herders also clean the livestock barns and shades, to meet the New Year fresh. The Bituun ceremony also includes burning candles to symbolize enlightenment of the samsara and all sentient beings and putting three pieces of ice at the doorway so that the horse of the deity Palden Lhamo could drink as the deity is believed to visit every household on this day. In the evening, families gather together—usually immediate family, in contrast to the large feast gatherings of White Moon day — and see out the old year eating dairy products and buuz. Traditionally, Mongolians settle all issues and repay all debts from the old year by this day.

Food 
Depending on the region, food is prepared in a diverse array of forms. For example, the traditional food in Mongolia for the festival includes dairy products, rice with curds (tsagaa-цагаа) or rice with raisins (berees-бэрээс), a pyramid of traditional cookies erected on a large dish in a special fashion symbolising Mount Sumeru or Shambhala realm, a grilled side of sheep and minced beef or minced mutton steamed inside pastry, steamed dumplings known as buuz, horse meat and traditional cookies Boortsog. Tsagaan Sar is a lavish feast, requiring preparation days in advance, as the men and women make large quantities of buuz as a whole family, along with ul boov, a pastry reserved for both dessert and presentation.

During the socialist era
During Mongolia's Socialist  period, the government banned Tsagaan Sar after Choibalsan's death in 1952 and tried to replace it with a holiday called "Collective Herder's Day", but the holiday was practiced again after the 1990 Democratic Revolution in Mongolia.

Dates 

The Mongol calendar in the Tegus Buyantu (Төгсбуянт) system is a lunisolar calendar. The Tegus Buyantu astrology was developed by Mongol high priest Luvsandanzanjantsan (1639–1704), thought to be the first reincarnation of the Blama-yin Gegegen (Ламын гэгээн).
Tsagaan Sar is celebrated on the first through third days of the first lunar month.

See also
 List of Buddhist festivals
 Celebrations of Lunar New Year in other parts of Asia:
 Chinese New Year (Spring Festival)
 Korean New Year (Seollal)
 Japanese New Year (Shōgatsu)
 Tibetan New Year (Losar)
 Vietnamese New Year (Tết Nguyên Đán)
 Similar Asian Lunisolar New Year celebrations that occur in April:
 Burmese New Year (Thingyan)
 Cambodian New Year (Chaul Chnam Thmey)
 Lao New Year (Pii Mai)
 Sri Lankan New Year (Aluth Avuruddu)
 Thai New Year (Songkran)
 Naadam
 Nowruz
 Ul boov

Notes

References 

Festivals in Mongolia
New Year celebrations
Buddhist holidays
Shamanistic festivals
Cultural festivals in Mongolia
Winter traditions
Mongol mythology
January observances
February observances
Observances on non-Gregorian calendars
Winter events in Mongolia
New Year in Mongolia
Buddhist festivals
Shamanistic holidays